Marc François Enoumba (born 4 March 1993) is a professional footballer who plays as a defender for Always Ready. Born in Cameroon, he represents the Bolivia national team.

International career
Having lived in Bolivia for over 5 years, Enoumba is eligible to play for the Bolivia national team. He made his debut on 2 September 2021 in a World Cup qualifier against Colombia, a 1–1 home draw. He substituted Diego Bejarano at half-time.

International goals

References

External links
 
 

1993 births
Living people
Footballers from Douala
Bolivian footballers
Bolivia international footballers
Bolivian people of African descent
Cameroonian footballers
Cameroonian emigrants to Bolivia
Association football defenders
Club Always Ready players
Bolivian Primera División players
Expatriate footballers in Bolivia
Cameroonian expatriate footballers
Cameroonian expatriate sportspeople in Bolivia
Naturalized citizens of Bolivia